Juan Marcelo Escobar Chena (born 3 July 1995) is a Paraguayan professional footballer who plays as either a centre-back or right-back for Liga MX club Cruz Azul and the Paraguay national team. Escobar held the highest transfer fee in Paraguayan football from 2019 to 2022, when he joined Cruz Azul.

Club career

Sportivo Luqueño
Born in Luque, Escobar started his career with hometown side Sportivo Luqueño. Promoted to the first team ahead of the 2014 season, he made his first team – and Primera División – debut on 16 February of that year, starting in a 3–0 away loss against Nacional Asunción.

Escobar subsequently became a regular starter for the side, and scored his first professional goal on 4 May 2016, netting his team's second in a 2–2 home draw against Sol de América.

Cerro Porteño
On 28 December 2017, Escobar agreed to a five-year contract with Cerro Porteño, for a rumoured fee of US$ 1 million. He was a regular starter during his first campaign, playing as a central defender and partnering Marcos Cáceres.

Cruz Azul
In 2019, he joined Mexican club Cruz Azul for a fee of USD$7, 000, 000.00, surpassing a 20-year transfer fee record in Paraguayan football held by Roque Santa Cruz when he joined Bundesliga team Bayern Munich for USD$6, 900, 000.00 in 1999.

International career
After representing Paraguay at under-20 level in the 2015 South American Youth Football Championship, and under-23 level in the 2015 Pan American Games, Escobar was first called up to the full side on 21 June 2017, for a friendly against Mexico. He made his full international debut on 1 July, starting in a 2–1 loss at the CenturyLink Field in Seattle.

Career statistics

Club

International

Honours
Cruz Azul
Liga MX: Guardianes 2021
Campeón de Campeones: 2021
Supercopa de la Liga MX: 2022
Supercopa MX: 2019
Leagues Cup: 2019

Individual
Liga MX All-Star: 2021, 2022
Liga MX Goal of the Tournament: 2021–22

See also
 List of outfield association footballers who played in goal
 Players and Records in Paraguayan Football

References

External links

1995 births
Living people
Paraguayan footballers
Association football defenders
Paraguayan Primera División players
Liga MX players
Sportivo Luqueño players
Cerro Porteño players
Cruz Azul footballers
Paraguayan expatriate footballers
Expatriate footballers in Mexico
2015 South American Youth Football Championship players
Footballers at the 2015 Pan American Games
Paraguay under-20 international footballers
Paraguay international footballers
Sportspeople from Luque
2019 Copa América players
Pan American Games competitors for Paraguay